Serge Attukwei Clottey (born 1985) is a Ghanaian artist who works across installation, performance, photography and sculpture. He is the creator of Afrogallonism, an artistic concept, which he describes as 'an artistic concept to explore the relationship between the prevalence of the yellow oil gallons in regards to consumption and necessity in the life of the modern African.'
As the founder of Ghana's GoLokal, Clottey tries to transform society through art.

He is based at Labadi, a suburb of Accra.

Early life and education 
Clottey was born in Accra in 1985 and started exhibiting his works around 2003. He was educated at the Ghanatta College of Art and Design in Accra. He then moved to Brazil where he attended Guignard University of Art of Minas Gerais. In 2019 he received an Honorary Doctorate of Art from the University of Brighton.

Exhibitions

Solo exhibitions

 2022: Tribe and Tribulation, The Line (art trail), London, UK
 2022: Erased Past, Brigade, Copenhagen, Denmark 
 2022: Gold Falls, Desert X, AlUla, Saudi Arabia
 2022: The Bodies Left Behind, Ritz-Carlton South Beach, Miami, FL 
 2021: Distinctive Gestures, Gallery 1957, London, UK 
 2021: Beyond Skin, Simchowitz, Los Angeles, CA 
 2020: Sensitive Balance, GNYP Gallery, Berlin
 2020: Serge Attukwei Clottey: ADESA WE, Ever Gold [Projects], San Francisco
 2020: Serge Attukwei Clottey: Routes, The Mistake Room, Los Angeles
 2019: Serge Attukwei Clottey: Sometime in your Life, Lorenzelli arte, Milano
 2019: Serge Attukwei Clottey: Solo Chorus, The Mistake Room, Los Angeles
 2019: Kubatana, Vestfossen Kunstlaboratorium, Oslo
 2019: Current Affairs, Fabrica, Brighton
 2018: Everyday Myth: Survival and Sustenance, Ever Gold [Projects], San Francisco
 2018: 360LA, Accra
 2018: Differences Between, Jane Lombard Gallery, New York City
 2018: Gallery Takeover, Lawrie Shabibi Gallery, Dubai
 2018: The Displaced, Gallery 1957 at Lawrie Shabibi Gallery, Dubai, UAE 
 2017: Gallery 1957 at Cape Town Art Fair, Cape Town, South Africa 
 2017: Gallery 1957 at 1:54 Contemporary African Art Fair, New York, NY 
 2017: Burning in Water w/ Frédéric Bruly Bouabré, New York, NY 
 2016: My Mother’s Wardrobe, Gallery 1957, Accra, Ghana 
 2016: Hand to Mouth, Ever Gold [Projects], San Francisco, CA 
 2016: Earthly Conversations, GNYP Gallery, Berlin, Germany 
 2016: Solo presentation w/ Gallery 1957 at 1:54 Contemporary African Art Fair, London, UK 
 2015: The Displaced, Mesler/Feuer, New York, NY 
 2008: Global Warming (Featured Project), British Council, Accra, Ghana 
 2008: Portrait of Accra, Junior Art Club Sponsorship, Bristol, UK

Group exhibitions
 2022: The Storytellers, Gallery 1957, London, UK 
 2022 Contemporary African Art, Palm Springs Art Museum, Palm Springs, CA
 2021: La Condition Publique, Roubaix, France 
 2021: Desert X, Curated by Cesar Garcia and Neville Wakefield, Palm Desert, CA 
 2021: Kugarisana, Simchowitz at Christie’s Beverly Hills, CA 
 2021: Materiality, Iziko South Africa National Gallery, Cape Town, South Africa
 2020: Radical Revisionists: Contemporary African Artists Confronting Past and Present, Moody Center, Houston
 2019: Fabrica, Brighton Festival, UK 
 2019: Tradition Interrupted, Bedford Gallery, Walnut Creek, CA 
 2019: Stormy Weather, Museum Arnhem, Arnhem
 2018: Right at the Equator, Depart Foundation, Malibu
 2018: Art Los Angeles Contemporary w/ Ever Gold [Projects], Los Angeles, CA
 2018: Untitled Art Fair, Miami
 2018: Defying the Narrative: Contemporary Art from West and Southern Africa, Ever Gold [Projects], San Francisco
 2017: Dans Un Ciel Ensoleille, UTA Artist Space, Los Angeles, CA 
 2017: Atsala Tsala (A Selection of Contemporary African Art), Patricia Low Contemporary, Gstaad, Switzerland 
 2017: Untitled Group Show, Ibid Gallery, Los Angeles, CA 
 2017: Group Show, Blank Projects, Cape Town, South Africa 
 2016: Practical Common Sense, Chale Wote Street Art Festival, Accra, Ghana 
 2015: Spielzeiteröffnung 2015: We Don’t Contemporary Festival, Hamburg, Germany 
 2015: What is Matter, Intelligentsia Gallery, Beijing, China 
 2015: The Silence of Ordinary Things, The Mistake Room, Los Angeles, CA 
 2014: Colour Unfinished, 27th Festival Les Instants Vidéo, Marseille, France 
 2014: Migration Messages, Collective Realities of African Migration, Werkstätten-nd Kulturhaus, Vienna, Austria 
 2014: Global Art Local View, European Monument Day, Mohr- Villa, Münich, Germany 
 2014: MULTIPOINT, The International Art Symposium, Nitra, Slovakia 
 2014: African Contemporary Photography, The Auction Room & Ozwald Boateng, London, UK 
 2014: 4 Masked/Unmasked, DAK’ART - 11th Biennale de l’Art Africain Contemporain, Dakar, Senegal 
 2014: ‘Colour Unfinished, Du Bois In Our Time II,’ University of Amherst 
 2014: Nubuke Foundation and the Du Bois Centre, Accra, Ghana 
 2013: Muses, Goethe Institut, Accra, Ghana 
 2013: Art Speaks, Werkstätten-und Kulturhaus, Vienna, Austria 
 2013: Inside The Mosquito Net, Alliance Française, Accra, Ghana 
 2013: We Are Africa, Nubuke Foundation, Accra, Ghana 
 2012: Time, Trade & Travel, Stedeljik Museum, Amsterdam, Denmark 
 2012: The Beautiful Ones Are Not Yet Born, Goethe Institut, Accra, Ghana 
 2012: Alternative Independence Day Celebration, Freedom Tour, Nubuke Foundation, Accra, Ghana 
 2012: Inside The Mosquito Net, Brazil House, Jamestown, Ghana 
 2011: Cultures in Confluence, Alliance Française & Goethe Institut, Accra, Ghana 
 2011: Trash To Treasure, Alliance Française & Goethe Institut, Accra, Ghana 
 2011: Climate Change, Caspar House, Accra, Ghana 
 2009: Africa Show, African Contemporary Art, Naples, Italy 
 2008: Untying the Human Spirit, CAN 2008, Goethe Institut, Accra, Ghana

 Recognition 
In August 2019, Clottey received the award of honorary Doctorate of Arts from the University of Brighton.

Selected Bibliography
Jana, Rosalind. “Louise Bourgeois and how old clothes can haunt us”, BBC Style. April 6, 2022.

Jamal, Ashraf. “Beyond Skin? Ashraf Jamal reflects on Serge Attukwei Clottey’s recent solo”, Art Africa Magazine. May 21, 2021. 

Keh, Pei-Ru. “Serge Attukwei Clottey on fashion, gender, and unexpected art”, Wallpaper. May 4, 2021.

Fontaine, Pearl. “Serge Attukwei Clottey, from Afrogallonism to Duct Tape Portraiture”, whitewall, April 2021.

Berardini, Andrew. “Dry Goods”, Artforum, April 29, 2021. 

Looseleaf, Victoria. “Serge Attukwei Clottey Exploring Issues of Belonging and Place”, Art Now LA, April 17, 2021. 

Knight, Christopher. Review: "Desert X has a great big wall. Beyond that, this art biennial feels thin”, Los Angeles Times, March 16, 2021. 

Ebert, Grace. “Two Imposing Cubes Covered in Yellow Plastic by Artist Serge Attukwei Clottey Respond to Global Water Insecurity”, Colossal, March 16, 2021. 

Quinn Olivar, Amanda. “SERGE ATTUKWEI CLOTTEY” Curator, March, 2021. 

Finkel, Jori. “Desert X Artists Dig Beneath the Sandy Surface”, The New York Times, March 12, 2021. 

Glentzer, Molly. “Contemporary African artists shine in ‘Radical Revisionists’ show”, Houston Chronicle, January 30, 2021. 

Brady, Anna and Carrigan Margaret. “Private view: must-see gallery shows opening in January”, The Art Newspaper, January 6, 2021. 

Caldwell, Erica. “To Go Local.” BOMB magazine, August 26, 2019. 

Can, Gülnaz. “The Migration of Yellow Plastica Gallons.” Wall Street International Magazine, 29 April, 2019. 

Donoghue, Katy. “Serge Attukwei Clottey Uses Performance to Address Political, Social, and Local Issues.” Whitewall, 3 April, 2019. Harpers Bazaar Arabia Art'' (cover), July, 2019. 

Donoghoe, Katy. ‘SERGE ATTUKWEI CLOTTEY’S “TIME AFTER TIME”’, Whitewall Magazine. 

Chase, Dylan. ‘If this jerrycan could talk’, Flaunt Magazine.  

Gotthardt, Alexxa. ‘Serge Attukwei Clottey Is Creating a Real-Life Yellow Brick Road in Accra’, Artsy. 

‘In pictures: Follow Ghana's 'yellow-brick road', BBC News. 

‘Ghanaian artist making art for Facebook HQ from plastic waste’, BBC World. 

Nnadi, Chioma. ‘This Artist Is Wearing His Mother’s Clothing to Promote Social Change in Ghana’, Vogue Magazine. 

Frizzell, Nell. ‘Serge Attukwei Clottey: the artist urging African men to dress as Women’, The Guardian.

References

1985 births
Living people
Ghanaian artists